Dominik Hrbatý was the defending champion of the singles event at the Heineken Open tennis tournament, held in Auckland, New Zealand, but lost in the first round to Gilles Elseneer.

Sixth-seeded Greg Rusedski won in the final 6–7(0–7), 6–4, 7–5 against Unseeded Jérôme Golmard.

Seeds
A champion seed is indicated in bold text while text in italics indicates the round in which that seed was eliminated.

  Marat Safin (second round)
  Goran Ivanišević (quarterfinals)
  Jan-Michael Gambill (first round)
  Sjeng Schalken (second round)
  Jiří Novák (semifinals)
  Greg Rusedski (champion)
  Andreas Vinciguerra (first round)
  Dominik Hrbatý (first round)

Draw

References

External links
 ITF – tournament edition details
 Singles draw
 Qualifying Singles draw

2002 Heineken Open
Singles